Blažo Perutović (born 8 December 1983) is a Montenegrin retired football striker.

Club career
He played with FK Sutjeska Nikšić, OFK Beograd, FK Mogren, FK Budućnost Podgorica, NK Domžale, OFK Petrovac and FK Lovćen.

Honours
Lovćen
Montenegrin Cup: 2014

External links
 Profile at NK Domžale official site
 
 

1983 births
Living people
Sportspeople from Cetinje
Association football forwards
Serbia and Montenegro footballers
Montenegrin footballers
FK Sutjeska Nikšić players
OFK Beograd players
FK Mogren players
FK Lovćen players
NK Domžale players
FK Budućnost Podgorica players
OFK Petrovac players
FK Iskra Danilovgrad players
First League of Serbia and Montenegro players
Montenegrin First League players
Slovenian PrvaLiga players
Montenegrin expatriate footballers
Expatriate footballers in Slovenia
Montenegrin expatriate sportspeople in Slovenia